Caulospongia biflabellata, commonly known as the western staircase sponge, is a species of sea sponge belonging to the family Suberitidae. It is a marine sponge of the temperate waters of Australia (Northwest Cape to Albany, WA).

It was first described by Jane Fromont in 1998, from a specimen collected from Limestone reef flat, Cheyne Beach, Western Australia

References 

Suberitidae
Sponges of Australia
Taxa named by Jane Fromont